Earl Jones may refer to:

Earl Jones (athlete) (born 1964), American runner
Earl Jones (basketball) (born 1961), American basketball player
Earl Jones (politician), former member of the North Carolina legislature
Earl Jones (investment advisor) (born 1942), Canadian who pleaded guilty to perpetrating a Ponzi scheme
Earl Jones (pitcher) (1919–1989), Major League Baseball player
Earl Jones (American football) (born 1957), American football cornerback
Earl Jones (third baseman) (fl. 1937), American baseball player